In a Brilliant White is the seventh studio album by Norwegian group Fra Lippo Lippi; this time, with vocalist Per Øystein Sørensen as the sole member (as bassist/founder Rune Kristoffersen retired to manage his record label). The band's first studio album in more than a decade, it contains mostly Sorensen's works and was initially produced and released only in the Philippines by EMI Music Philippines in 2002.

"Later" became a hit in the Philippines even before the album was released, receiving massive airplay on radio which rejuvenated the band's popularity in the Philippines. Hence, EMI Music Philippines (now Polyeast Records) decided to produce a full-length album with it. "Wish We Were Two" was released as a second single, a collaboration between Sorensen and Filipino R&B singer Kyla. However, this single did not receive as much local airplay and never charted.

This album was also released in Norway eventually, following releases over other countries in Asia. Carrying the Fra Lippo Lippi name, Sorensen visited the country once again to play sold-out concerts and appeared on MYX TV and other variety shows such as ASAP.

Track listing

 "Story of a Broken Heart"
 "Faithful"
 "Will I Recognize"
 "Come On"
 "Later"
 "Wish We Were Two" (featuring Kyla)
 "Ordinary Guy"
 "Stay"
 "Who Is Your Buddha
 "If I Knew Then"

Personnel
Per Øystein Sørensen – vocals, keyboards, producer
Stein Austrud – keyboards
Svein Dag Hauge – engineer, guitar, producer, programming
Giert Clausen – engineer (Norway)
Dante Tañedo – engineer (Philippines)
Espen Berg – mastering
Darrell James Laxamana – project manager, producer

References

Fra Lippo Lippi (band) albums
2002 albums
Virgin Records albums